This list of alluvial sites in Switzerland is based on the Federal Inventory of Alluvial sites of National Importance, part of a 1992 Ordinance of the Swiss Federal Council implementing the Federal Law on the Protection of Nature and Cultural Heritage. It lists heritage floodplains of Switzerland.

Inventory of Alluvial sites of National Importance

See also 
 Nature parks in Switzerland

References

External links

Switzerland - Floodplains of National Importance (CH03), Common Database on Designated Areas (CDDA)
Alluvial zones in Switzerland
Auenberatungsstelle/Service conseil Zones alluviales 

Switzerland geography-related lists
Switzerland nature-related lists
Protected areas of Switzerland
Switzerland